The following is the 1978–79 network television schedule for the three major English language commercial broadcast networks in the United States. The schedule covers primetime hours from September 1978 through August 1979. The schedule is followed by a list per network of returning series, new series, and series cancelled after the 1977–78 season. All times are Eastern and Pacific, with certain exceptions, such as Monday Night Football.

New fall series are highlighted in bold. Series ending their original runs are in italics.

Each of the 30 highest-rated shows is listed with its rank and rating as determined by Nielsen Media Research.

 Yellow indicates the programs in the top 10 for the season.
 Cyan indicates the programs in the top 20 for the season.
 Magenta indicates the programs in the top 30 for the season.

PBS is not included; member stations have local flexibility over most of their schedules and broadcast times for network shows may vary.

Sunday 

Notes: On CBS, the premiere (and only) episode of Co-Ed Fever aired on February 4 from 10:30 to 11:00 p.m., after which the show was cancelled. Moses the Lawgiver was a rerun of the 1975 miniseries. Mr. Dugan was supposed to premiere March 11, 1979 between All in the Family and Alice but due to black Congressmembers' criticism of it after a preview for them, the show was never broadcast. On NBC, the Centennial miniseries aired as part of The Big Event.

Monday

Tuesday

Wednesday 

Notes: The Wheels segment of NBC Novels for Television was a rerun of the 1978 miniseries. Laugh-In consisted of reruns of the 1977 television series.

Thursday 

Note: Mork & Mindy had a one-hour premiere on September 14, 1978.

Note: The NBC Novels for Television segment The Innocent and the Damned was a rerun of the 1977 television miniseries Aspen.

Note: Coasttocoast was supposed to air Thursdays 10:00-11:00PM, but NBC's new boss Fred Silverman canceled the show.

Friday

Saturday

By network

ABC

Returning Series
20/20
The ABC Sunday Night Movie
Barney Miller
Carter Country
Charlie's Angels
Donny & Marie
Eight Is Enough
Family
Fantasy Island
Happy Days
The Hardy Boys Mysteries
How the West Was Won
Laverne & Shirley
Lucan
The Love Boat
Monday Night Baseball
Monday Night Football
Operation Petticoat
Soap
Starsky & Hutch
Three's Company
Vega$
Welcome Back, Kotter
What's Happening!!

New Series
13 Queens Boulevard *
Angie *
Apple Pie
Battlestar Galactica
Carol Burnett & Company *
Delta House *
Detective School *
Doctors' Private Lives *
Friends *
The MacKenzies of Paradise Cove *
Makin' It *
Mork & Mindy
The Ropers *
Salvage 1 *
Taxi

Not returning from 1977–78:
Baretta
Fish
Free Country
The Harvey Korman Show
A.E.S. Hudson Street
Having Babies
Mel & Susan Together
The Redd Foxx Comedy Hour
The San Pedro Beach Bums
The Six Million Dollar Man
Sugar Time!
Tabitha

CBS

Returning Series
60 Minutes
Alice
All in the Family
The Amazing Spider-Man
Barnaby Jones
Dallas
Good Times
Hawaii Five-O
The Incredible Hulk
The Jeffersons
Lou Grant
M*A*S*H
One Day at a Time
The New Adventures of Wonder Woman
Rhoda
The Waltons

New Series
The American Girls
The Bad News Bears *
Billy *
The Chisholms *
Dear Detective *
Dorothy *
The Dukes of Hazzard *
Flatbush *
Flying High
Hanging In *
In the Beginning
Just Friends *
Kaz
Married: The First Year
Mary
The Mary Tyler Moore Hour *
Miss Winslow and Son *
The Paper Chase
Time Express *
The White Shadow *
WKRP in Cincinnati

Not returning from 1977–78:
Another Day
Baby I'm Back
The Betty White Show
The Bob Newhart Show
Busting Loose
The Carol Burnett Show
Celebrity Challenge of the Sexes
The Fitzpatricks
Husbands, Wives & Lovers
Kojak
Logan's Run
Maude
On Our Own
Rafferty
Sam
The Shields and Yarnell Show
Switch
Szysznyk
The Ted Knight Show
The Tony Randall Show
We've Got Each Other
Young Dan'l Boone

NBC

Returning Series
The Big Event
CHiPs
Joe & Valerie
Laugh-In
Little House on the Prairie
NBC Monday Night at the Movies
Project U.F.O.
Quincy, M.E.
The Rockford Files
The Runaways
Weekend
The Wonderful World of Disney

New Series
B. J. and the Bear *
Brothers and Sisters *
Cliffhangers *
David Cassidy: Man Undercover
Dick Clark's Live Wednesday
Diff'rent Strokes *
The Duke *
The Eddie Capra Mysteries
Grandpa Goes to Washington
Harris and Company *
Hello, Larry *
Highcliffe Manor *
Hizzonner *
Lifeline
Kate Loves a Mystery *
Presenting Susan Anton *
Real People *
Supertrain *
$weepstake$ *
Sword of Justice
Turnabout *
W.E.B.
The Waverly Wonders
Who's Watching the Kids
Whodunnit? *

Not returning from 1977–78:
Black Sheep Squadron
Big Hawaii
The Bionic Woman
Chico and the Man
Chuck Barris Rah Rah Show
Columbo
C.P.O. Sharkey
The Hanna-Barbera Happy Hour
James at 15
The Life and Times of Grizzly Adams
Man from Atlantis
Mulligan's Stew
The Oregon Trail
Police Woman
Quark
The Richard Pryor Show
Richie Brockelman, Private Eye
Rollergirls
Rosetti and Ryan
Sanford Arms
What Really Happened to the Class of '65?

Note: The * indicates that the program was introduced in midseason.

References

Additional sources
 Castleman, H. & Podrazik, W. (1982). Watching TV: Four Decades of American Television. New York: McGraw-Hill. 314 pp.
 McNeil, Alex. Total Television. Fourth edition. New York: Penguin Books. .
 Brooks, Tim & Marsh, Earle (1985). The Complete Directory to Prime Time Network TV Shows (3rd ed.). New York: Ballantine. .

United States primetime network television schedules
1978 in American television
1979 in American television